Petronije Selaković (fl. April 1648) was a Serbian Orthodox monk of the Krka monastery who led a Morlach army during the Cretan War (1645–69) against the Ottoman Empire. His army came as far as the Sava river (April 1648).

See also
Petar Jagodić
Matija Žabetić
Ilija Nanić
Morlachs
Morlachs (Venetian irregulars)
Vuk Mandušić (fl. 1648), military commander in Venetian service
Stojan Janković (1636–1687), Morlach leader
Stanislav Sočivica, Venetian rebel
Sinobad
Cvijan Šarić
Bajo Pivljanin
Grujica Žeravica
Vukosav Puhalović
Ilija Smiljanić
Petar Smiljanić
Vuk Močivuna
Juraj Vranić
Tadije Vranić

References

17th-century Serbian people
Republic of Venice military personnel
Serbian military leaders
Serbs of Croatia
Serbian Orthodox clergy
Venetian period in the history of Croatia
Cretan War (1645–1669)